The 1944 Fleet City Bluejackets football team was an American football team during the 1944 season. The Bluejackets represented the United States Navy's "Fleet City" facilities located near Dublin, California, which included Camp Parks, Camp Shoemaker, the Receiving Barracks, and a Navy Hospital. The team compiled a 6–4–1 record.

The 1944 Fleet City team was coached by Jack Malevich, who played college football at Catholic University in the 1920s. Tracey Kellow, who played for the 1935 TCU team that won the Sugar Bowl, was an assistant coach.

The team played its home games at Forster Field, named in honor of base commander O. N. Forster, who was described as a "rabid fan" of the team.  

Key players included Pro Football Hall of Famer Joe Stydahar, College Football Hall of Famer Bob Suffridge, and halfback Bill Schroeder, who later played in the NFL.

Schedule

References

 
Fleet City
Fleet City